Vivien Risling Hailstone (October 16, 1913 – July 8, 2000) was a Yurok/Karok basketweaver, jewelry designer, activist and educator who led efforts to sustain traditional basket weaving patterns and techniques. Hailstone also had an impact on statewide policy for repatriation of Native American remains and returning to Native American names for parks through her involvement with the State of California Department of Parks and Recreation Commission.

Early life 
Vivien Hailstone was born Vivien Geneva Risling in Humboldt County, California on October 16, 1913 to Geneva Orcutt (Yurok/Karok) and David Risling (Karok and a member of the Hupa tribe). Her great-grandmother, Jane Young (Yurok), taught her many traditional stories, songs, and basketry techniques. Her brother was David Risling, Jr. a co-founder of D–Q University. Hailstone grew up in a rural area, and at age 10, she was enrolled in a Bureau of Indian Affairs boarding school in the Hoopa Valley In 1940, Vivien married Albert Hailstone (Wintu) and they a child, named Albert Jr.

Career and advocacy 
Hailstone's efforts to sustain and promote traditional basketry are evidenced through her work in her Native community and her teaching at local colleges. She was a founding member of a pottery guild in the 1940s which incorporated Indian basketry designs into pottery designs. She served as Chair of College of the Redwood Extension Board of Directors in the 1950s and taught basketry classes at D–Q University. In 1959, Hailstone opened I-Ye-Quee Trading Post & Gift Shop, which contributed to a revival of interest in Native American basketry.

Hailstone was also an accomplished jewelry maker and designer.

In addition to her basketmaking and jewelry, Hailstone was also an advocate for education and Native American concerns at the state level. She was a founding member of the Redding, California chapter of the California Indian Education Association. In the 1970s, Hailstone became the first Native American to serve on the State of California Department of Parks and Recreation Commission. She advocated for a reburial policy for remains and using Native American names for parks.

Death and legacy 

Vivien Hailstone died in 2000. In 2003, the California Indian Basketweavers Association produced a video documenting Hailstone's life and basketry techniques. Throughout her life Hailstone collected baskets. Her collection, along with pieces collected by her son Albert, were donated to the Clarke Historical Museum in Eureka, California.

References 

1913 births
2000 deaths
Yurok people
Native American basket weavers
Native American women artists
People from Humboldt County, California
Native American people from California
Artists from California
20th-century American women artists
20th-century Native American women
20th-century Native Americans